The Talbots, Inc. (doing business as Talbots and stylized as TALBOTS) is an American specialty retailer and direct marketer of women's clothing, shoes and fashion accessories.

As of 2018, the company operated 495 Talbots stores in the United States: 425 core Talbots stores (412 U.S), 65 Talbots Factory Outlets (U.S.) and five Talbots Clearance stores (4 U.S.). The company's retail operation comprises approximately 80% of its overall business, with the other 20% conducted via catalog and internet.

History
The first shop, located in Hingham, Massachusetts, was opened in 1947 by Rudolf and Nancy Talbot. In 1948, the Talbots launched a direct mail business by distributing 3,000 fliers to names obtained from The New Yorker magazine. In 1973, they sold the company, consisting of a growing catalog enterprise and five stores, to General Mills.

The chain was expanded along the U.S. east coast. When General Mills divested its Specialty Retail Division in 1988, Talbots was acquired by JUSCO Co. Ltd. (now ÆON Co., Ltd.).

Talbots became a public company in 1993 and was traded on the New York Stock Exchange under the symbol TLB. The New York City-based private equity firm Sycamore Partners acquired Talbots in August 2012 for $391 million (including debt).

References

External links 

Companies formerly listed on the New York Stock Exchange
Privately held companies based in Massachusetts
American companies established in 1947
Clothing companies established in 1947
Retail companies established in 1947
2012 mergers and acquisitions
Clothing retailers of the United States
1947 establishments in Massachusetts
Private equity portfolio companies
Companies based in Plymouth County, Massachusetts
Hingham, Massachusetts
1993 initial public offerings